Pakkam Kottur is a small village in Tamil Nadu, a southern state of India. The nearest town of significant size which is Tiruvarur is 16 km away, Mayiladuthurai is 30 km, and Nagapattinam is around 20 km away. There is bus services from Tiruvarur daily. The nearest railway station was 3 kilometres away in Visalur but the introduction of bus services put an end to the Visalur station in 1988. Now the nearest railway station is Nannilam. The village boasts of an Indian Overseas Bank branch, a post office and other basic amenities. There is a govt primary school in the village but those wishing to get a secondary education need to go to Enangudi, 2.5 km away. Most of them own rice fields and it is a means of income for them. A majority of the villagers are Muslims, and most of the males are working in foreign countries like Singapore, Malaysia, Kuwait, Saudi Arabia, United States and UAE. Recently, the villagers have realised the importance of education and are sending their children to colleges and universities and the number of villagers going overseas for business, manual labour is decreasing.

There are around 1,000 houses, two mosques, a few temples, and about 30 shops in the village. Pakkam Kottur is surrounded by 8 or 9 mini-villages.

This village has some of the beautiful sceneries and undisturbed calm for total relaxation. The river by the south surrounded by paddy fields is something that one should not miss during June-sep season. Surrounded by famous temples such as Thirukannapuram is just 3 km away. Thennamarkuddi (famous for treating Bone injury) is just 3.5 km away. People usually visits surrounding towns like Tiruvarur, Kariakkal, Nagapattinam, Mailadithurai & Kumbakonam for all their major shopping needs, visiting specialists Drs. Nagoor & Velankanni is about 25 km & 40 km respectively.

Villages in Tiruvarur district